is a city in Aomori Prefecture, Japan. , the city had an estimated population of 58,905 in 28031 households, and a population density of 81 persons per km2 The total area of the city is .Towada is home to the national and prefectural agencies that administer the Kamikita region, and is the central city of the region. In October 2012, the city signed an agreement with nine surrounding municipalities to improve the living environment, and has a cooperative relationship with Misawa City, which has an airport and a U.S. Air Force base.

Geography
Towada is in the foothills of the Hakkōda Mountains and encompasses the Aomori portion of Lake Towada. The Oirase River passes through the town. Towada is an area rich in nature. To the west are Towada-Hachimantai National Park. In particular, Lake Towada and the Oirase River are famous tourist spots. As for industry, agriculture is thriving, and the city produces the largest amount of garlic in Japan.

More than half of the population of about 60,000 lives in the eastern urban area (Sanbongi area), with the central part of the city is characterized by its orderly grid-like streets. In particular, "Government Office Street" is a popular place for citizens to enjoy the Someiyoshino (Japanese cherry) trees planted along the street. In recent years, the city has been promoting its urban policy as a "Arts Towada," with the Towada Art Center (Art museum) as its centerpiece. The rest of the population is scattered in hamlets along the Oirase River and in the hilly western areas of the city.

The northwestern part of the city is at the foot of Mount Hakkōda, and has numerous hot springs, The southwestern part of the city is also mountainous, and contains  Lake Towada, which is a caldera lake, and Mount Ohanabe and Mount Towada, which are the outer rims. The Oirase River, the only outlet from Lake Towada, flows northeast from Nenokuchi on the east bank of Lake Towada. Water from the foot of Mount Hakkoda, which is located about 20 kilometers north, also flows into the Oirase River.
About 14 kilometers from Nenokuchi to Mount Yakeyama in Oirase River is called the Oirase Gorge.

Neighboring municipalities
Aomori Prefecture
Aomori
Hirakawa
Rokunohe
Shichinohe
Tōhoku
Gonohe
Shingō
Akita Prefecture
Kazuno
Kosaka

Climate
The city has a cold humid climate characterized by cool summers and cold winters with heavy snowfall (Köppen climate classification Cfa).  The average annual temperature in Towada is 9.8 °C. The average annual rainfall is 1233 mm with September as the wettest month. The temperatures are highest on average in August, at around 22.8 °C, and lowest in January, at around -2.3 °C.  Part of the city is within the limits of the Towada-Hachimantai National Park.

Demographics
Per Japanese census data, the population of Towada peaked at around the year 2000, and has been in decline since.

History
The project was headed by Nitobe Tsutō, the grandfather of Inazō Nitobe. The project was continued by the Meiji government, and the area was designated a ranch area for breeding cavalry horses by the Imperial Japanese Army in 1885. The inclement climate of the area was considered ideal for breeding horses that would be suitable for use in the cold climate areas of Manchuria and Siberia. The village of Sanbongi was established with the establishment of the modern municipalities system on April 1, 1889. On September 1, 1910, Sanbongi was designated a town. It was elevated to the status of a city on February 1, 1955. In October 1956, it changed its name to “Towada”.

On January 1, 2005, the town of Towadako (from Kamikita District) was merged into Towada.

Government
Towada has a mayor-council form of government with a directly elected mayor and a unicameral city legislature of 22 members. Towada contributes two members to the Aomori Prefectural Assembly. In terms of national politics, the town is part of Aomori 2nd district of the lower house of the Diet of Japan.

Economy
The economy of Towada is based largely on agriculture.

Education

Colleges and universities
Kitasato University - Towada Campus (School of Veterinary Medicine)

High schools
Towada has three public high schools operated by the Aomori Prefectural Board of Education
Sanbongi High School
Sanbongi Agriculture High School
Towada Technical High School

Elementary schools and middle schools
There are 15 public elementary schools and 9 public middle schools in Towada operated by the municipal government, and one middle school operated by the prefectural government.

Transportation

Railway
Towada currently has no passenger railway service. The Towada Kankō Electric Railway Line connecting Towada with Misawa had five stations within the city. It was discontinued in 2012 and replaced by a bus service.

Highway

Local attractions
 Towada-Hachimantai National Park
 Lake Towada
 Oirase River - listed as one of the 100 Soundscapes of Japan by the Japanese Ministry of the Environment
 Matsumi Falls - one of "Japan’s Top 100 Waterfalls" 
 Towada Art Center

International relations
  - Lethbridge, Alberta, Canada, sister city since 2002

Notable people from Towada
Junji Ishiwatari, musician, and former guitarist and songwriter for the Japanese rock band Supercar
Koji Kumagai, soccer player
Koji Nakamura, musician, and former guitarist and lead singer for the Japanese rock band Supercar

References

External links 

Official Website 
Chamber of Commerce Website 

 
Cities in Aomori Prefecture